Daniel "Danny" Avila Rosón (born April 1, 1995) is a Spanish house and electro house DJ and producer.

Career
He has worked with Tiësto, Deniz Koyu and Fedde Le Grand. His first set was in 2010 in the Spanish club Kapital. In 2011, he was nominated as the "DJ Revelación" at the Vicious Music Awards by Ron Barceló 2011. In the summer of 2012 he was the youngest DJ of the beach club Blue Marlin. In September 2012 he worked in the United States, the Tour Generation Wild with the artists Deniz Koyu, Mikael Weermets, Sick Individuals and dBerrie. He also worked in Macau, Manila, London, and San Paolo.

Ávila debuted at the Ultra Music Festival of Miami in March 2013. He signed a contract with MGM of Vegas as the youngest resident in the history of Hakkasan in 2013 with artists like Steve Aoki, Laidback Luke, Deadmau5, Tommy Trash, Tiesto and Calvin Harris.

MTV and Billboard identified his as "one to watch".

In November 2014, Danny partnered with EDM lifestyle brand Electric Family to produce a collaboration bracelet for which 100% of the proceeds are donated to Doctors Without Borders. The partnership has raised over $1k as of November 2014.

Discography

Compilations 
2012: Danny Avila's Big Room Mix [DJ Magazine]

Singles

Charted singles

Other singles 
2012: "Breaking Your Fall" [Big Beat Records]
2013: "Voltage" [Spinnin' Records] 
2013: "Tronco" [Musical Freedom] 
2013: "Rasta Funk" [Spinnin' Records] 
2013: "Poseidon" [Musical Freedom] 
2014: "Rock the Place" (vs. twoloud) [Musical Freedom] 
2014: "Boom!" (with Merzo) [Dim Mak]
2015: "Plastik" [Playbox Music]
2015: "Close Your Eyes" (with Kaaze) (Official Parookaville Festival Anthem) [Playbox Music]
2015: "C.H.E.C.K" [Playbox Music] 
2016: "High" (featuring Haliene) [Ultra Records] 
2017: "Loco" (with Nervo featuring Reverie) [Spinnin' Records]
2018: "Brah" [Spinnin' Premium]
2018: "End of the Night" [Sony Music Entertainment]
2019: "Keep It Goin'" (with Deorro) [Ultra Records]
2019: "Fast Forward" [Smash The House]
2019: "Chase The Sun" (Planet Funk identical song sampled) [Spinnin' Records]
2020: "Beautiful Girls" [Kontor / Paper Rocket Music]
2020: "Run Wild" [Musical Freedom]
2020: "Remedy" (featuring Salena Mastroianni) [Hexagon]
2020: "The Unknown" [Hexagon]
2020: "Pushin" [Musical Freedom]
2020: "My Blood" [Spinnin' Records]
2021: "No One Else Is You" [Heartfeldt Records]
2021: "Mother & Father" (featuring Bukhu) [Armada Music]
2021: "The Baddest" (featuring Kris Kiss) [Armada Music]
2021: "The Captain" [Armada Music]

Remixes 
2011: Germán Brigante – "Tiki Taka" (DJ Mind & Danny Avila Remix)
2012: M.A.N.D.Y. & Booka Shade – "Body Language" (Danny Avila Bootleg)
2013: Skylar Grey – "C'mon Let Me Ride" (Mikael Weermets & Danny Avila's Trapstep Remix)
2013: Krewella – "Live for the Night" (Deniz Koyu & Danny Avila Remix)
2014: Stromae – "Tous les mêmes" (Lucas Divino, Andres Chevalle & Danny Avila Dirty Dutch Remix)
2016: MNEK & Zara Larsson - "Never Forget You"  (Danny Avila Bootleg) 
2017: Gavin James - "I Don't Know Why" (Danny Avila Remix)

References

External links 

Spanish DJs
Musicians from Madrid
Remixers
1995 births
Living people
Electro house musicians
Electronic dance music DJs
Sony Music Spain artists